The 1966 British Columbia general election was the 28th general election in the Province of British Columbia, Canada. It was held to elect members of the Legislative Assembly of British Columbia. The election was called on August 5, 1966 and held on September 12, 1966.  The new legislature met for the first time on January 24, 1967.

The conservative Social Credit Party was re-elected with a majority in the legislature to a sixth term in government. It increased its share of the popular vote by close to five percentage points to over 45%, and winning the same number of seats (33) as in the previous election.

The opposition New Democratic Party also increased its share of the popular vote by over five percentage points, but won only two additional seats.

The Liberal Party won about 20% of the popular vote, and one additional seat, for a total of six.

The Progressive Conservative Party was virtually wiped out: it nominated only three candidates (down from 44 in the previous election), and its share of the popular vote fell from over 11% to a negligible amount.

Results

Note:

* Party did not nominate candidates in the previous election.

Results by riding
Note: Winners of each election are in bold.

|-
||    
|align="center"|Howard Richmond McDiarmid
|align="center"  |Alberni<small>Social Credit
||    
||    
|align="center"  |Atlin<small>New Democrat
|align="center"|Frank Arthur Calder
||    
|-
||    
|align="center"|Frank Richter, Jr.
|align="center"  |Boundary-Similkameen<small>Social Credit
||    
||    
|align="center"  |Burnaby-Edmonds<small>New Democrat
|align="center"|Gordon Dowding
||    
|-
||    
|align="center"|William Collins Speare
|align="center"  |Cariboo<small>Social Credit
||    
||    
|align="center"  |Burnaby North<small>New Democrat
|align="center"|Eileen Dailly
||    
|-
||    
|align="center"|William Kenneth Kiernan
|align="center"  |Chilliwack<small>Social Credit
||    
||    
|align="center"  |Burnaby-Willingdon<small>New Democrat
|align="center"|Fred Vulliamy
||    
|-
||    
|align="center"|James Roland Chabot
|align="center"  |Columbia<small>Social Credit
||    
||    
|align="center"  |Coquitlam<small>New Democrat
|align="center"|Dave Barrett
||    
|-
||    
|align="center"|Daniel Robert John Campbell
|align="center"  |Comox<small>Social Credit
||    
||    
|align="center"  |Cowichan-Malahat<small>New Democrat
|align="center"|Robert Martin Strachan2
||    
|-
||    
|align="center"|Robert Wenman
|align="center"  |Delta<small>Social Credit
||    
||    
|align="center"  |Kootenay<small>New Democrat
|align="center"|Leo Thomas Nimsick
||    
|-
||    
|align="center"|George Mussallem
|align="center"  |Dewdney<small>Social Credit
||    
||    
|align="center"  |Nanaimo<small>New Democrat
|align="center"|David Stupich
||    
|-
||    
|align="center"|Herbert Joseph Bruch
|align="center"  |Esquimalt<small>Social Credit
||    
||    
|align="center"  |New Westminster<small>New Democrat
|align="center"|Rae Eddie
||    
|-
||    
|align="center"|Ray Gillis Williston
|align="center"  |Fort George<small>Social Credit
||    
||    
|align="center"  |Revelstoke-Slocan<small>New Democrat
|align="center"|Randolph Harding
||    
|-
||    
|align="center"|Philip Arthur Gaglardi<small>
|align="center"  |Kamloops<small>Social Credit
||    
||    
|align="center"  |Surrey<small>New Democrat
|align="center"|Ernest Hall
||    
|-
||    
|align="center"|Hunter Bertram Vogel
|align="center"  |Langley<small>Social Credit
||    
||    
|align="center" rowspan=2 |Vancouver-Burrard<small>New Democrat
|align="center"|Thomas Rodney Berger
||    
|-
||    
|align="center"|Isabel Dawson
|align="center"  |Mackenzie<small>Social Credit
||    
||    
|align="center"|Raymond Parkinson
||    
|-
||    
|align="center"|Wesley Drewett Black
|align="center"  |Nelson-Creston<small>Social Credit
||    
||    
|align="center" rowspan=2 |Vancouver East<small>New Democrat
|align="center"|Alexander Barrett MacDonald
||    
|-
||    
|align="center"|Patricia Jordan
|align="center"  |North Okanagan<small>Social Credit
||    
||    
|align="center"|Arthur James Turner  
||    
|-
||    
|align="center"|Dean Edward Smith
|align="center"  |North Peace River<small>Social Credit
||    
||    
|align="center"  |Yale-Lillooet<small>New Democrat
|align="center"|William Leonard Hartley  
||    
|-
||    
|align="center"|Cyril Morley Shelford
|align="center"  |Omineca<small>Social Credit
||    
||    
|align="center"  |North Vancouver-Capilano<small>Liberal
|align="center"|Ray Perrault
||    
|-
||    
|align="center"|William Harvey Murray
|align="center"  |Prince Rupert<small>Social Credit
||    
||    
|align="center"  |North Vancouver-Seymour<small>Liberal
|align="center"|Barrie Aird Clark
||    
|-
||    
|align="center"|Ernest A. LeCours
|align="center"  |Richmond<small>Social Credit
||    
||    
|align="center"  |Oak Bay<small>Liberal
|align="center"|Alan Brock MacFarlane
||    
|-
||    
|align="center"|Donald Leslie Brothers
|align="center"  |Rossland-Trail<small>Social Credit
||    
||    
|align="center" rowspan=2 |Vancouver-Point Grey<small>Liberal
|align="center"|Garde Basil Gardom
||    
|-
||    
|align="center"|John Douglas Tidball Tisdalle
|align="center"  |Saanich and the Islands<small>Social Credit
||    
||    
|align="center"|Patrick Lucey McGeer
||    
|-
||    
|align="center"|Willis Franklin Jefcoat
|align="center"  |Shuswap<small>Social Credit
||    
||    
|align="center"  |West Vancouver-Howe Sound<small>Liberal
|align="center"|Louis Allan Williams
||    
|-
||    
|align="center"|Dudley George Little
|align="center"  |Skeena<small>Social Credit
||    
|-
||    
|align="center"|William Andrew Cecil Bennett1
|align="center"  |South Okanagan<small>Social Credit
||    
|-
||    
|align="center"|Donald McGray Phillips<small>
|align="center"  |South Peace River<small>Social Credit
||    
|-
||    
|align="center"|Harold Peter (Herb) Capozzi
|align="center" rowspan=2  |Vancouver Centre<small>Social Credit
||    
|-
||    
|align="center"|Evan Maurice Wolfe
||    
|-
||    
|align="center"|Grace Mary McCarthy
|align="center" rowspan=2  |Vancouver-Little Mountain<small>Social Credit
||    
|-
||    
|align="center"|Leslie Raymond Peterson
||    
|-
||    
|align="center"|Thomas Audley Bate
|align="center" rowspan=2 |Vancouver South<small>Social Credit
||    
|-
||    
|align="center"|Ralph Raymond Loffmark
||    
|-
||    
|align="center"|William Neelands Chant
|align="center" rowspan=2 |Victoria<small>Social Credit
||    
|-
||    
|align="center"|Waldo McTavish Skillings
||    
|-
|
|align="center"|1 Premier-Elect
|align="center"|2 Leader of the Opposition
|-
|-
| align="center" colspan="10"|Source: Elections BC
|-
|}

See also
List of British Columbia political parties

Further reading
 

1966
1966 elections in Canada
1966 in British Columbia
September 1966 events in Canada